Michael Saks may refer to:
 Michael J. Saks, professor of law at the Sandra Day O'Connor College of Law at Arizona State University
 Michael Saks (mathematician), professor at Rutgers University